Weetangera is a suburb in the Belconnen district of Canberra, located within the Australian Capital Territory, Australia. The Pinnacle Nature Reserve, a Canberra Nature Park is adjacent to the south of the suburb, across Springvale Drive.

Etymology
Weetangera is named after the original name of the property "Spring Vale", which in turn had been given a name of Aboriginal origin. In 1934, Australian journalist Frederic Slater claimed that the name "Wittanjirra" was an Aboriginal word meaning "to suck, to drink greedily", referring to a spring near the Weetangera Public School. However, Slater does not provide evidence to support this claim.

History 
Aboriginal settlement of the Australian Capital Territory dates back over 20,000 years. Grinding grooves located on the Molonglo River to the south of Weetangera provide evidence of Aboriginal use of the region pre-colonisation. Members of the 'Canberra Tribe' continued to camp near Weetangera until the 1860s.

Europeans first settled in the area in the 1820s, with the name Weetangera (also Weetangerra and Weetangara in early documents) applied to the local vicinity from this time. Weetangera was also the name for the historic Weetangera parish, which included the land from Ginninderra Creek to the Molonglo River.

The Weetangera Public School was first built to service the area in 1875, facing onto the Weetangera Road (now Belconnen Way).

Samuel Shumack lived at "Spring Vale" in Weetangera between 1866 and 1915. Shumack and his father had taken up the land for farming when Samuel was eight years old. Samuel Shumack lived on the property with his family until it was claimed as land for the nation's capital in 1915.

The Southwell family were significant to Weetangera, and various members of the family are buried in the Weetangera Cemetery and former Methodist Church now sited to the west of the adjoining suburb, Hawker.

The modern suburb of Weetangera was officially gazetted by the ACT Government in 1968, with a street theme: 'Pioneers of the Australian Capital Territory'. After the gazetting, the first modern settlers moved into the suburb in 1970 and the first students moved into the Weetangera Primary School, located about a kilometre from the old Weetangera Primary School, in 1973. Today, the suburb is home to over 2500 people.

Political representation 

For the purposes of Australian federal elections for the House of Representatives, Weetangera is in the Division of Canberra.

For the purposes of Australian Capital Territory elections for the ACT Legislative Assembly, Weetangera is in the Ginninderra electorate.

Demographics
People who live in Weetangera are called Weetangerans. The census shows that Weetangera residents have a median age of 43 which is older than the ACT median of 35 and the Australian median of 38.

Weetangera's population is predominantly Australian-born; 75.0 per cent on census night 2016. The second most common birthplace was England at 4.3 per cent. The most common religion is 'no religion', with 41.0% of the population reporting they were not religious.

Suburb amenities
Weetangera has a small shopping centre containing a bakery, beauty salon, dentist, coffee shop, gym, Pakistani restaurant and cleaner.

The suburb is also home to the Weetangera Neighbourhood Oval.  The ACT Government announced restoration plans for the oval in June 2012, committing $4 million to three ovals, including the Weetangera oval, over a three-year period. The money is for the installation of irrigation systems, synthetic cricket wickets and practice nets, floodlights and a small pavilion and toilet block.

Educational institutions
Both Weetangera Primary School (1973–present) and Weetangera Preschool.

Historic Public School

The first Public School (pre-High School) was sited on land of the original farming property, and opened on 27 April 1875, with 27 students. The first teacher was Mr Ewan Cameron, a member of the Weetangera community and a parent of a student.

The site is between (beside) the present Belconnen Way (north) and Smith and Kinleyside Streets (south). It now a park, with children's play area, with several lines of pine trees that were planted by students of the original school in about 1919 and 1928/9 (Arbor Day).

People honoured in the streets of Weetangera
The street names in Weetangera are predominantly named for ACT pioneers:

Abernethy Street  James Abernethy (1830–1920), an overseer and later superintendent of ` Station', 1857–63; schoolmaster and clerk at St John the Baptist Church, 1863–80. 
Bambridge Street  Edwin Elijah Bambridge (1815–1879), who planted some of the first willow trees along the Molonglo River. 
Belconnen Way  "Belconnen" was originally the name of a pioneer's homestead and later of a rural district of the ACT. 
Coppin Place  John Coppin (born circa 1840). Coppins Crossing, across the lower Molonglo River, is also named for John Coppin. 
Coulter Drive  Robert Charles Coulter (1864–1956); an architect and landscape painter and the co-designer of an award-winning plan in the competition for a Design for the National Capital held in 1911. 
Crace Street  Edward Kendall Crace (1844–1892); one of the original settlers in the Gungahlin area becoming one of the largest landholders in the district; purchased the 'Gungahlin' and 'Ginninderra' properties from William Davis in 1877 and also acquired 'Charnwood'. 
Darmody Street  John Darmody (1817–1877); employed at 'Duntroon Station' in 1858.
Davis Street  William Davis, senior (1821–1876); arrived in the colony from England on 6 March 1842 on the Palestine with his wife, Jane Elizabeth (née Weston) and several of their children; went to 'Lanyon', home of his daughter and son-in-law; the family moved to Booroomba, where they remained until the early 1860s; sold the property to Charles McKeahnie; Davis then moved to Ginninderra Cottage where he remained until the early 1870s after which he moved to Goulburn; he died in 1876 and his wife died in 1888.
De Salis Street  Leopold Fabius Dietegen Fane de Salis (1816–1898); a pioneer pastoralist and politician.  He purchased Cuppacumbalong Station in 1856; De Salis was the Member for Queanbeyan, 1864–69 and a Member of the Legislative Council of New South Wales, 1874–98.
Gibbes Place  Augustus Onslow Manby Gibbes (1828–1897); owned Yarralumla sheep station between 1858 and 1881, purchased from Sir Terence Aubrey Murray and sold to Frederick Campbell.
Gillespie Street  John Gillespie (1809–1889); owned 'Horse Park Station', Ginninderra, 1856–89. 
Harcourt Street  George Harcourt (died 1893), a storekeeper in Ginninderra.  
Jones Place  Thomas Jones (1812–1887); arrived in the district in 1825; carpenter and farmer; held land at Rocky Gully near Mulligan's Flat, Gungahlin District. 
Kilby Crescent  William Kilby (1811–1902); settled at 'Lands End' in Weetangera. 
Line Place  Thomas Harrington Line (1828–1878); a schoolteacher at Canberra, 1858–60; Superintendent of 'Duntroon Station', 1860; also worked the 'Glebe Farm', 1859.
Mathieson Crescent  William Mathieson (1837–1882); a shepherd on 'Ginninderra Station' from 1860 to 1882. 
Mayo Street  Alfred William Mayo (1856–1936); a pioneering farmer of the Majura area.
McKeahnie Street  Charles McKeahnie (1809–1903); owner, at various times, of properties in Boboyan, Gudgenby, Orroral and Booroomba areas.  He and his wife Elizabeth came to Australia from Scotland in 1838. They were the grandparents of Charlie McKeahnie, who some historians believe to be the inspiration for the poem 'The Man from Snowy River' by Banjo Paterson.
McLachlan Crescent  Allan McLachlan (1835–1878); the manager of "Duntroon Station" in 1876. 
Morton Street  Andrew Morton (1812–1881); a pioneer medical practitioner and coroner in the Queanbeyan district.
Mowle Place  Stewart Majoribanks Mowle (1822–1908); employed at 'Yarralumla Station' between 1838 and 1845.
O'Rourke Street  Terence O'Rourke (1831–1896); employed on 'Duntroon Station' during the 1850s.
Packer Street  William James Packer (1793–1881); the first settler at Gundaroo in 1824, who owned 'Esthermead Estate'.
Plummer Street  Levi Plummer (1822–1876); settled at Weetangera in the early 1870s; died after falling from a horse in 1876; his wife, Frances (née Guthridge), died in 1891. 
Shumack Street  Richard Shumack (1817–1887); father of Samuel Shumack and employed at 'Duntroon Station' between 1856 and 1858 and later with his son, Samuel, established 'Springvale Station' at Weetangera.
Smith Street  named for ACT pioneer clergymen. 
Southwell Street  Thomas Southwell (1813–1881); the owner of "Parkwood" station from 1854. Southwell was responsible for the introduction of Methodism into the Weetangera area. 
Springvale Drive  named for a homestead in the Weetangera area established by Samuel Shumack and his father Richard Shumack in 1866. 
Vest Place  Richard Vest (1855–1922); an overseer at 'Yarralumla Station', 1897–1911. 
Webb Place  George Solomon Webb (1783–1868); a pioneer settler in the Tidbinbilla area, 1833; married to Sarah Rolfe, the step-daughter of Timothy Beard. Their eldest daughter Eliza Webb married John McDonald, the son of the original settlers at Uriarra. Mount Eliza in Tidbinbilla is believed to be named in her honour. 
Weetangera Place  the name has been associated with the area since the days of the early settlers.

Geology

Silurian age green grey rhyodacite of the Walker Volcanics underlie the whole suburb.

References

Suburbs of Canberra